Danckwerts is a surname. Notable people with the surname include:

 Dankwart Danckwerts (born 1933), German sociologist
 William Otto Adolph Julius Danckwerts (1853–1914), British lawyer and Privy Counsellor, and father of:
 Sir Harold Danckwerts (1888–1978), British lawyer, judge and Privy Counsellor
 Rear-Admiral Victor Danckwerts (1890–1944), Royal Navy admiral and father of:
 Peter Danckwerts, chemical engineer and George Cross recipient

See also
 Danckerts, a surname